Brad Thomas Pirioua (born 6 March 2000) is a footballer who plays as a midfielder for Aubagne. Born in France, he plays for the Central African Republic national team.

Career
Pirioua got his first experience abroad in January 2020 when he signed with the Belgian club La Louvière Centre where he stayed 6 months. In July 2020, he signed a contract with Montargis. On 1 August 2021, he moved to Spain and joined Atlético Porcuna. On December 29, 2021, Pirioua and  Atlético Porcuna decided to mutually terminate the contract.

International career
Pirioua made his debut with the Central African Republic national team in a 3–1 2022 FIFA World Cup qualification loss to Liberia on 16 November 2021.

References

External links
 
 

2000 births
Living people
People from Lagny-sur-Marne
Citizens of the Central African Republic through descent
Central African Republic footballers
Central African Republic international footballers
French footballers
French sportspeople of Central African Republic descent
Association football forwards
Primera Federación players
Championnat National 3 players
Central African Republic expatriate footballers
Central African Republic expatriate sportspeople in Spain
French expatriate footballers
French expatriate sportspeople in Spain
Expatriate footballers in Spain